Kimsa Willk'i (Aymara kimsa three, willk'i gap "three gaps", also spelled Quimsa Willkhi) is a  mountain in the Bolivian Andes. It is located in the La Paz Department, Inquisivi Province, in the south of the Quime Municipality. Kimsa Willk'i is situated south-east of the mountain Wisk'achani. The lakes Muyu Quta (Muyu Khota) and Wiska Quta (Wisca Khota) lie at its feet, north-west of it.

The river Quta K'uchu ("lake corner", Khotakhuchu) which later is called Tres Cruzes (Spanish for "three crosses") originates at the mountain. It flows to the south-west as a tributary of Río Monte Blanco (Spanish for "white mountain river").

References 

Mountains of La Paz Department (Bolivia)